Thompson is a city in Grand Forks County, North Dakota, United States. It is part of the "Grand Forks, ND-MN Metropolitan Statistical Area" or "Greater Grand Forks".  It is located on the border of Allendale and Walle townships, with Walle on the east and Allendale on the west.  The population was 1,101 at the 2020 census. Thompson was founded in 1881.

History

The first residents of the town were businessmen who had come to support the needs of new settlers to the area. The town was first called Norton because the first buildings of the town were adjacent to land owned by George Norton. However, when the railroad came in 1881, the name caused an issue, since there was already a nearby town of Norton in Minnesota.

Albert Thompson, co-owner of a general store with his brother Robert, was commissioned postmaster in January of 1881. The name of the town was then changed to Thompson in honor of Albert Thompson.

Geography

Thompson is located at  (47.775821, −97.106538).

Demographics

2010 census
As of the census of 2010, there were 986 people, 356 households, and 293 families living in the city. The racial makeup of the city was 98.1% White, 0.3% African American, 1.0% Native American, 0.1% Asian, 0.1% from other races, and 0.4% from two or more races. Hispanic or Latino of any race were 0.9% of the population.

There were 356 households, of which 42.1% had children under the age of 18 living with them, 73.0% were married couples living together, 7.0% had a female householder with no husband present, 2.2% had a male householder with no wife present, and 17.7% were non-families. 14.9% of all households were made up of individuals, and 4.8% had someone living alone who was 65 years of age or older. The average household size was 2.77 and the average family size was 3.04.

The median age in the city was 36.8 years. 28.4% of residents were under the age of 18; 6.9% were between the ages of 18 and 24; 27.2% were from 25 to 44; 30.5% were from 45 to 64; and 7.1% were 65 years of age or older. The gender makeup of the city was 51.0% male and 49.0% female.

2000 census
As of the census of 2000, there were 1,006 people, 329 households, and 273 families living in the city. The racial makeup of the city was 97.71% White, 0.40% African American, 0.10% Native American, 0.70% Asian, 0.20% from other races, and 0.89% from two or more races. Hispanic or Latino of any race were 0.80% of the population.

There were 329 households, out of which 53.2% had children under the age of 18 living with them, 74.5% were married couples living together, 4.3% had a female householder with no husband present, and 17.0% were non-families. 15.2% of all households were made up of individuals, and 6.4% had someone living alone who was 65 years of age or older. The average household size was 3.06 and the average family size was 3.43.

In the city, the population was spread out, with 34.9% under the age of 18, 6.3% from 18 to 24, 33.4% from 25 to 44, 19.8% from 45 to 64, and 5.7% who were 65 years of age or older. The median age was 33 years. For every 100 females, there were 105.7 males. For every 100 females age 18 and over, there were 97.9 males.

The median income for a household in the city was $54,514, and the median income for a family was $57,250. Males had a median income of $35,682 versus $21,298 for females. The per capita income for the city was $19,857. None of the families and 0.7% of the population were living below the poverty line, including no under eighteens and 7.7% of those over 64.

Education

The city is served by Thompson Public School. The school offers grades K–12.

High school championships

 State Class 'B' track & field: 1997 (4th place)
 State Class 'B' volleyball: 1997, 1998, 2004, 2005, 2018
 State Class 'B' baseball: 1983, 1985, 1999, 2005
 State Class 'B' jazz: 2010 (4th place)
 State Class 'B' hip-hop: 2011 (4th place)
 State Class 'B' football: 1993 semi-finalist, 1995 finalist, 1996 semi-finalist, 2010 semi-final loss, 2016 State Champions, 2018 State Champions.
State Class ‘B’ boys basketball: 2019 Champions

References

External links

 City of Thompson official website
 Thompson Public School website
 Memories of yesterday : Thompson centennial, 1881–1981, June 26–28, Thompson, North Dakota from the Digital Horizons website

Cities in Grand Forks County, North Dakota
Cities in North Dakota
Greater Grand Forks
Populated places established in 1881
1881 establishments in Dakota Territory